Nečujam  is a bay and village on the island of Šolta in Croatia in the Split-Dalmatia County. It is connected by the D111 highway. Nečujam has 171 inhabitants.

Image gallery

References

Populated places in Split-Dalmatia County
Šolta